Karelian pasties, Karelian pies or Karelian pirogs (singular kalitta; Olonets Karelian: šipainiekku; , singular karjalanpiirakka;  karelskiy pirozhok or калитка kalitka) are traditional pasties or pirogs originating from the region of Karelia. They are eaten throughout Finland as well as in adjacent areas such as Estonia and northern Russia.

The oldest traditional pasties usually had a rye crust, but the North Karelian and Ladoga Karelian variants also contained wheat to improve the quality of the crust. The usual fillings were barley and talkkuna. In the 19th century, first potato, and then buckwheat were introduced as fillings, and later, boiled rice and millet.

Today, the most popular version has a thin rye crust with a filling of rice. Mashed potato and rice-and-carrot fillings are also commonly available. Butter, often mixed with chopped-up boiled egg (egg butter or munavoi), is spread over the hot pasties before eating.

Karjalanpiirakka has had Traditional Speciality Guaranteed (TSG) status in Europe since 2003. This means that any producer not following the traditional recipe cannot call them karjalanpiirakka and instead, will have to call them riisipiirakka ("rice pasties"), perunapiirakka ("potato pasties") etc., depending on the filling.

See also

 Finnish cuisine
 Karelian hot pot
 Kalakukko
 Cornish pasty
 List of butter dishes
 List of pastries
 Khachapuri
 Sklandrausis
 Vatrushka
 Sultsina

References

External links
Karelian pasties recipe at Wikibooks Cookbook

Finnish cuisine
Estonian cuisine
Karelian cuisine
Russian cuisine
Karelia
Traditional Speciality Guaranteed products from Finland
Rye-based dishes
Savoury pies